Darbar Mahal is a palace in the city of Bahawalpur, Pakistan. The building was built to hold courtly events and government offices of the former princely state of Bahawalpur. The palace was built by Bahawal Khan V, and initially named Mubarak Mahal. It was completed in 1905, and is near several other palaces within the Bahawalgarh Palace Complex, including the Nishat Mahal, Farrukh Mahal and Gulzar Mahal. The palace sits in a 75 acre garden. The entire palace complex was leased to the armed forces beginning in 1966, and houses government and military offices. It is not open to the general public. The Nawabs of Bahawalpur were also particularly interested in the arts. That is why they built their palaces in this context, considered among the most beautiful and modern palaces of their time in the entire subcontinent. And it is also true that even today, their glory is exactly the same as it was on the first day. Due to the attention of the Pakistan Army and the Department of Archeology, these palaces are still an example of awe, grandeur and artistic masterpiece. The Pakistan Army took care of it and invested time and money to enhance its beauty. I wish that these palaces like Noor Mahal should also be opened for the common person and tourists so that the world can see this beautiful hidden treasure. The most beautiful pictures below are the illumination of Darbar Mahal and Bara Dari. The sight of which makes a person lost in the world of thoughts. At night in the modern lights, this “Darbar Mahal & Bara Dari” looks like a bride and groom, whose groom always loves her. read more..

Architecture 
It is built in a style which combines local, Arabic, and European influences. The exterior has intricate carvings, fretwork, and stucco work. Each side of the building features a large entranceway and jharoka balconies. The building's third floor is a Mughal-style chattri roof with each of its corners having a highly-stylized octagonal turret with Sikh-style domes.

Gallery

References

Bahawalpur (princely state)
1905 establishments in India
Palaces in Pakistan
Buildings and structures completed in 1905
Tourist attractions in Bahawalpur
Buildings and structures in Bahawalpur